De Courcy Island is one of the Gulf Islands of the coast of southwestern British Columbia, Canada, located between the Pylades and Stuart Channels approximately  southeast of Nanaimo and approximately  southwest of Vancouver.

This island group runs parallel to the east coast of Vancouver Island inside the protection of the larger Gabriola Island and Valdes Island. Access by boat from Nanaimo in the north is through Dodd Narrows. From Vancouver, vessels pass between Gabriola Island and Valdes Island through Gabriola Passage. Both Dodd Narrows and Gabriola Passage have strong tidal currents. Gabriola and Valdes Islands protect these smaller islands from the more open Strait of Georgia.

De Courcy Island is home to Pirates Cove Marine Provincial Park. The only access to the island is by boat or floatplane. Gulf Island Seaplanes flies to the island daily. It was also the home of Brother XII, a mysterious cult figure in the 1920s. The island is named after Vice Admiral Michael de Courcy, captain of HMS Pylades.

References

External links
Google Maps Satellite Image, Accessed August 7, 2006

http://www.decourcyisland.com

Islands of the Gulf Islands
Regional District of Nanaimo